Yanqiao Station is a metro station on Line 1 of the Wuxi Metro. It began operations on 1 July 2014.

The station will be an interchange station with Line S1, also known as Wuxi-Jiangyin intercity railway or Xicheng line (锡澄线), towards Jiangyin (a county-level city administered by Wuxi).

Station layout

Exits
This station has 4 exits.

References

External links

Railway stations in Jiangsu
Wuxi Metro stations
Railway stations in China opened in 2014